Kurtamysh is a town and the administrative center of Kurtamyshsky District in Kurgan Oblast, Russia, located on the Kurtamysh River  southwest of Kurgan, the administrative center of the oblast. Population:

History
It was founded in 1745 as a fortification on the Kurtamysh River. Since 1762 it is referred to as the sloboda of Kurtamyshskaya.  It was granted town status in 1956.

Administrative and municipal status
Within the framework of administrative divisions, Kurtamysh serves as the administrative center of Kurtamyshsky District. As an administrative division, it is incorporated within Kurtamyshsky District as Kurtamysh Town Under District Jurisdiction. As a municipal division, Kurtamysh Town Under District Jurisdiction is incorporated within Kurtamyshsky Municipal District as Kurtamysh Urban Settlement.

References

Notes

Sources

External links

 Official website of Kurtamysh
 Unofficial website of Kurtamysh

Cities and towns in Kurgan Oblast
Populated places established in 1745
1745 establishments in the Russian Empire